During the 1973–74 English football season, Everton F.C. competed in the Football League First Division. They finished 7th in the table with 44 points.

Final League Table

Results

Football League First Division

FA Cup

League Cup

Texaco Cup

Squad

>

References

1973–74
Everton F.C. season